RKO Pictures (also known as RKO Productions, Radio Pictures, RKO Radio Pictures, and RKO Teleradio Pictures) is an American film production and distribution company. The original company produced films from 1929 through 1957, with releases extending until its dissolution in 1959. On October 23, 1928, RCA announced that it had acquired control of the Film Booking Offices of America studio and Keith-Albee-Orpheum theater chain and was merging them under a holding company, Radio-Keith-Orpheum Corp. Its new production arm was incorporated as RKO Productions Inc. on January 25, 1929. While RKO Distributing Corp. was originally organized as a distinct business entity, by July 1930 the studio was transitioning into the new, unified RKO Radio Pictures Inc. In December, RKO announced that it would be acquiring Pathé Exchange, including its studio and backlot in Culver City, film laboratories in New Jersey, distribution exchanges in the United States and Great Britain, and the Pathé News operation. In 1931–32, RKO Pathé operated as a semiautonomous division of RKO Pictures.

In the 1930s and 1940s, Hollywood's Golden Age, RKO was one of the Big Five studios. Its lineup of acting talent during this period included Cary Grant, Katharine Hepburn, Fred Astaire, Ginger Rogers, and Robert Mitchum. Among the studio's most notable films are Cimarron (winner of the 1931 Academy Award for Best Picture), King Kong (1933), Bringing Up Baby (1938), The Hunchback of Notre Dame (1939), The Best Years of Our Lives (1946—the studio's only other Academy Award for Best Picture), and what some people consider the greatest film of all time, 1941's Citizen Kane.

The studio declined after Howard Hughes acquired ownership in 1948, and it was sold to the General Tire and Rubber Company in 1955. After several years of attempting to save the company, in January 1957, General Tire reached an agreement with Universal Pictures, where Universal would distribute the remaining RKO product, but the agreement effectively ended all film production at RKO. In 1959 General Tire put all of its non-core operations in a holding company, RKO General, which in 1978 reconstituted RKO Pictures Inc. as a production subsidiary, although the new company did not release its first film until 1981. General Tire sold RKO Pictures in 1989, at which point it began operating under new management as a small independent film company, RKO Pictures LLC.

All release dates are from the AFI Database, except as follows: those designated with an (*) are from imdb.com, and those designated with a (**) are from Theiapolis.com; other sources are noted with footnotes. The date listed is the earliest date, whether that be the premiere or the general release date. The order is according to release dates in the United States.

1929
RKO's first year of production resulted in the release of 13 films, highlighted by Syncopation, The Vagabond Lover, and Rio Rita. Two previous films titled Come and Get It (February 3, 1929) and The Drifter (February 8, 1929) were listed by AFI as RKO productions, but the copyright claimant is RKO's precursor, F.B.O. Productions, Inc.

The 1930s
The first full decade for the fledgling film studio was a mixture of large successes and deep instability, as the studio went through numerous management changes. The studio produced many classic films, such as Gunga Din, Cimarron (the first Western film to win the Academy Award for Best Picture, and only one of two RKO films to win that award), King Kong, Little Women, Anne of Green Gables, Top Hat, The Three Musketeers, Bringing Up Baby and The Hunchback of Notre Dame. During this decade, the studio owned the contracts of such notable talents as Cary Grant, Katharine Hepburn, Fred Astaire, Ginger Rogers, Mary Astor, Joel McCrea and Joan Fontaine, as well as off-screen talent such as Irving Berlin and John Ford. A major accomplishment for the studio came when they signed an exclusive distribution deal with Walt Disney Productions.

1930
The studio released 29 films that year, although there were no major critical or financial hits.

1931
RKO acquired Pathé in January, and released films under both the RKO and RKO Pathé labels. Combined, the studio would release 50 films during the year; its film Cimarron won the Best Picture Oscar. By the end of the year, David O. Selznick took over as the head of production for the studio.

1932
46 films were produced and released by RKO during the year. Although Selznick was successful in signing major talent like Fred Astaire, Katharine Hepburn and George Cukor, financially, it was one of the worst years for the studio, as it was for many other studios as the Great Depression deepened. The RKO Pathé label was completely abandoned during this year.

1933
RKO produced and/or distributed 49 films during the year. Selznick left the studio early in 1933 due to in-fighting over production control. As a result of the record losses in 1932, the studio went into receivership. Through all the hardship, and while posting a net loss for the year of just over $4 million, the studio saw some large successes, such as King Kong, Little Women, Flying Down to Rio (the first pairing of Astaire and Rogers), and Morning Glory (which netted Katharine Hepburn her first Oscar for Best Actress).

1934
RKO released 45 films in 1934. While the studio lost money, its losses were far less ($310,000) than they had been in the prior three years. The year saw George Stevens become a major director. Several highlights of the year were The Lost Patrol (the first RKO film directed by John Ford), Of Human Bondage, Anne of Green Gables, and The Little Minister.

1935
RKO released 42 films in 1935, of which it produced 39. There was yet another shake-up in the management structure of the studio, but the company saw its first profit since 1930, albeit a small one of $684,000. Highlights of the year included Alice Adams, and Becky Sharp (the first full-length feature film made entirely in Technicolor). The studio also saw several major disappointments, including The Last Days of Pompeii. In addition to the films produced, RKO acquired the distribution rights for The March of Time newsreel series in June 1935, a relationship with Time magazine that continued until July 1942. Released monthly, each edition was approximately 20 minutes long.

1936
1936 was another profitable year for RKO, which released 39 films. The studio saw the arrival of producer Howard Hawks as well as George and Ira Gershwin. Although the studio did well overall, two of the few outstanding pictures to come out during the year were Follow the Fleet and Swing Time, which were both Astaire and Rogers vehicles. One of the biggest disappointments of the year was Sylvia Scarlett, starring Katharine Hepburn.

1937
1937 was the most productive year in RKO's history, with the studio releasing 56 films, as well as entering into an agreement to distribute films produced by Walt Disney Productions, in place of Van Beuren Studios, which subsequently folded its operations. Snow White and the Seven Dwarfs, the first Disney film released by RKO, premiered in December 1937, although it underwent wide release in February 1938, and was a huge success. It was one of the few successes of the year for RKO, which again went through yet another management change. Another bright spot for the studio was Stage Door, which was only a small financial success, yet received very good critical notices, including four Oscar nominations.

1938
Profits for the studio fell again in 1938, on the release of 42 films, and the studio lost the talents of Katharine Hepburn, Joan Fontaine and Howard Hawks. However, they did gain the services of Garson Kanin. One of the biggest disappointments of the year was Bringing Up Baby. While today it is considered to be one of the finest comedies ever produced, at the time it was a box office flop. One of the few bright spots for RKO was the establishment of The Saint film series, which would run successfully through 1941.

1939
One of the biggest events for the studio this year was the signing of an agreement for Orson Welles to produce films for RKO. Even though 1939 was one of RKO's most creative years, with the release of 49 films, it ended the year showing a slight net loss. Highlights were Gunga Din, The Hunchback of Notre Dame,  Love Affair, Allegheny Uprising, The Story of Vernon and Irene Castle (RKO's last Astaire/Rogers film), Five Came Back, In Name Only, Bachelor Mother, Nurse Edith Cavell, and The Flying Deuces.

The 1940s
This decade saw a continuation of the revolving door policy regarding management and creative talent at the studio, although RKO made it out of receivership in 1940. The quality of the films also increased overall, the studio receiving its second Oscar for Best Film, for 1946's The Best Years of Our Lives, as well as producing what many consider the greatest film of all time, Citizen Kane in 1941. Howard Hughes' takeover of the studio in 1948 would begin a downward spiral for RKO.

1940
RKO released 55 pictures during this year, of which they produced 39. The studio also premiered two others, Little Men and Fantasia, which did not go into wide release until 1941 and 1942 respectively. The studio lost the services of director George Stevens this year, and despite emerging from receivership, RKO would post an almost $1 million loss in 1940. Highlights of the year included Abe Lincoln in Illinois, My Favorite Wife, Irene, and Kitty Foyle (which won an Academy Award for Best Actress for Ginger Rogers). In addition, the studio continued its successful Saint series, and released two major successes from Walt Disney: Pinocchio and Fantasia.

1941

RKO's year most likely will always be remembered for its release of Citizen Kane, which many consider to be the greatest film of all time. While the company saw a modest profit for the year, RKO lost the exclusive services of Ginger Rogers, the last great star of the studio, and Garson Kanin departed. Even the one bright spot, the signing of an agreement with the Samuel Goldwyn studios to distribute their films, was a double-edged sword, since the financial arrangements left little room for profits to be garnered by RKO. The studio released 45 films during the year, of which they produced 33. Highlights of the year, other than Citizen Kane, included Mr. and Mrs. Smith (a comedy directed by Alfred Hitchcock), the continuation of RKO's successful Saint franchise, The Devil and Miss Jones, The Little Foxes, Ball of Fire, Suspicion and Walt Disney's productions of The Reluctant Dragon and Dumbo; these last two were made, and one was released, in the midst of an animator strike at the Disney studio. A bit of trivia occurred this year when Bing Crosby's younger brother Bob made his film debut in Let's Make Music.

1942
In 1942, RKO was almost forced back into receivership, before Charles Koerner became head of production in March. The studio released 38 films in 1942, which included several films which they only distributed, such as another Walt Disney production, Bambi, which received mixed reviews at the time of its release, but has since been hailed as one of the hallmarks of Disney's animated canon. The year also saw the termination of the agreement between RKO and Orson Welles. There were few bright spots during the year, although one was the continuation of RKO's The Falcon series.

1943
1943 was a very profitable year for the studio, with 43 of the 46 films that were released during the year showing profits. The year also saw a few critical successes, such as Mr. Lucky, They Got Me Covered, Hitler's Children, and Behind the Rising Sun.

1944

1944 was another profitable year for the studio, which released 36 films. In addition, there were quite a few notable occurrences for RKO that year. First, they entered into an agreement to release the films by the independent production house, International Pictures; second, two major stars would make their film debuts — Robert Mitchum and Gregory Peck; and third, several notable writers would make their initial foray into directing: Clifford Odets, Howard Estabrook, and Herbert Biberman. The studio's film highlights of 1944 included Higher and Higher (Frank Sinatra's first film lead), The Princess and the Pirate, Tall in the Saddle, Murder, My Sweet, The Woman in the Window, and None But the Lonely Heart.

1945
Hampered by an industry-wide strike, RKO released only 34 films in 1945, but managed another profitable year. Two more independents agreed to distribution deals with the studio: Rainbow Productions and Liberty Films (Frank Capra's film company). The studio signed numerous stars during the year, such as John Wayne, Cary Grant, Bing Crosby, Ingrid Bergman, Rosalind Russell and Paul Henreid, and the year also marked the return of Ginger Rogers to the studio. Some of RKO's cinematic highlights of 1945 included Along Came Jones, The Enchanted Cottage, Johnny Angel, and The Spanish Main. Two notable films RKO released during 1945 were produced by outside companies: Walt Disney's The Three Caballeros and a film from Leo McCarey's Rainbow Productions named The Bells of St. Mary's; the latter film of the two would become the biggest grossing film in RKO's history.

1946
Perhaps the best overall year for the studio, it would rake in over $12M in profits, and release 38 films, some of which received high critical acclaim. Unfortunately for RKO, studio head Charles Koerner, the man responsible for this success, died of leukemia early in the year. Highlights of the year included  The Spiral Staircase, The Kid from Brooklyn, Till the End of Time, Notorious, The Best Years of Our Lives, It's a Wonderful Life and Nocturne. During the year, RKO also released a film that would haunt its producer's studio in years to come: Walt Disney's Song of the South.

1947
This year saw the beginning of activity by the House Un-American Activities Committee (HUAC) in the film industry. Two of the infamous "Hollywood Ten" were the only director and producer among that group (Edward Dmytryk and Adrian Scott, respectively), and were also two of RKO's top talent. In addition, production costs were rising at the same time that revenues, both domestically and overseas, were declining. Despite those challenges, the studio saw another profitable year, releasing 35 films. Some of more notable films released during 1947 included Trail Street, The Farmer's Daughter, The Bachelor and the Bobby-Soxer, Crossfire (the last picture of Scott and Dmytryk before their blacklist), Out of the Past, and the Samuel Goldwyn efforts The Bishop's Wife, and The Secret Life of Walter Mitty. Two of the largest disappointments (artistically and financially) were Mourning Becomes Electra and Tycoon.

1948

1948 marked the beginning of the slow end of the studio when Howard Hughes purchased enough stock to gain control of RKO. This precipitated another shake-up in the creative control at the production company, which in turn led to seventy-five percent of the studio's workforce being terminated in July, and production coming to a virtual standstill. RKO managed to release 32 films during the year, but most were either through distribution deals, or had been finished prior to Hughes' takeover. Despite the light release schedule, the studio did have a few highlights, which included Fort Apache, Mr. Blandings Builds His Dream House, Rachel and the Stranger, A Song Is Born, and Every Girl Should Be Married. In addition, I Remember Mama and The Pearl were critical, if not financial, successes. The biggest disappointment was Joan of Arc.

1949
This was not a banner year for the studio, as Hughes continued to interfere with the creative people underneath him. RKO only began production on 12 films during the year, although they would release 34. The few highlights of 1949 included The Set-Up, The Big Steal, Mighty Joe Young, and She Wore a Yellow Ribbon. They Live by Night was a critical success, but it did poorly at box office.

1950s
The decade would be the last for the original RKO Studio. The downward spiral which had begun upon Hughes' gaining control in 1948 continued. In addition, the studio suffered from a sequence of other difficulties, from which it was unable to overcome. These included a failed sale of the studio to several racketeers, the loss of RKO's chain of movie theaters (due to government regulation), and a multitude of lawsuits. The setbacks ultimately led, in 1955, to the studio's sale to General Teleradio, Inc., the entertainment subsidiary of General Tire and Rubber Company. Ironically, General Teleradio was basically a radio and television company, and it was competition with television which put the final nails in RKO's coffin. RKO ended production in 1958.

1950
Of the 30 films released by the studio during the year, approximately half were actually produced by the studio. In addition, not a single picture would generate profits greater than $100,000, the first time this happened in the history of RKO, and this resulted in the first net loss for the studio ($5.8M) in over a decade. Hope was raised when Hughes hired what many considered the top producer-writer team in Hollywood, Jerry Wald and Norman Krasna, who were contracted to produce 60 films over the next five years. The few highlights were all films which were not produced by RKO: The Outlaw (Jane Russell's debut — and a re-release of the film which had seen limited release as an independent Hughes' production in 1943 and 1946, so is not included in the below list), along with Walt Disney's productions of Cinderella and Treasure Island, the first project he made which was entirely live-action.

1951

The studio's slow slide to oblivion continued in 1951, exacerbated by the government requirement that they split off their theater operations from their film operations. The RKO Story, by Richard Jewell with Vernon Harbin, states that RKO had "... become the combination laughing stock and pariah of the entire industry." Barely showing a profit, the studio released 39 films, the highlights being: Payment on Demand, The Racket, The Thing from Another World (aka The Thing), Flying Leathernecks, and The Blue Veil. The biggest financial and critical disappointment RKO had during the year was a film from Walt Disney that would ironically be hailed as an animated classic: Alice in Wonderland.

1952
According to The RKO Story, "... 1952 was the most tempestuous year in the history of an altogether tempestuous enterprise." The studio was plagued by lawsuits, and Howard Hughes would eventually sell his stock in the company. However, the group he sold it to was involved in scandal, and was forced to back out of the deal prior to year's end, leaving the studio virtually without an owner. RKO lost over $10 million on the release of 31 films, half of which were not produced by the studio. In fact, the studio only produced one film in the last five months of the year. 1952 saw few cinematic highlights, and the company's only successes that year came in Rashomon (a Japanese film which had opened in December of the prior year) and Samuel Goldwyn's production of Hans Christian Andersen. The last Goldwyn production to be distributed by RKO Radio Pictures, in fact.

1953
The year was another disaster for the studio, which was mired in lawsuits. The company returned to the control of Howard Hughes, but the studio released only 24 films during the year, the fewest total since their inaugural year of 1929, which had not been a full year. Of those 24 films, only 8 were actual RKO productions. Disney's Peter Pan, the Academy Award-winning documentary The Sea Around Us, and the 3-D Second Chance comprised the trio of highlights for the studio during 1953. On June 23, 1953, Walt Disney severed ties with RKO after a heated dispute with Hughes over the distribution of his True-Life Adventures series of nature documentaries, opting to form his own distribution company.

1954
Although Howard Hughes purchased all the outstanding shares of stock of the company, becoming the first individual to own a major studio since the era of silent films, the downward trajectory of RKO continued. Only 14 films were released, and there was not a single notable one among them.

1955
Howard Hughes sold RKO to General Teleradio in the middle of the year. Teleradio was the entertainment arm of the General Tire and Rubber Company, and had purchased the studio to gain access to its film library, which it intended to air on its small network of television stations. RKO became a division in the new company, RKO Teleradio Pictures. While the studio came up with its own version of the wide screen format, called Superscope, they would only release 14 films during the year, the only one of which was notable was the musical, Oklahoma!, which RKO distributed.

1956

While the studio increased its number of releases to 20 in 1956, by year's end the fact that RKO was looking to sell part of its distribution arm was a signal that the death knell was tolling for the studio. There were, however, a few notable films released, such as Fritz Lang's final two American films, While the City Sleeps, and Beyond a Reasonable Doubt. The studio's highest-grossing film of the year, The Conqueror, was also its biggest financial flop, since its $4.5 million in North American rentals did not come close to covering its $6 million cost.

1957
This was the end of production for the original RKO Radio Pictures. All production was halted in January, and distribution was handled by Universal-International. Only 11 films were released, and none were noteworthy.

1958–60
While the studio was no longer producing films, it would release the 12 it had already made over the three-year period from 1958 to 1960.

1960s–1970s
RKO Pictures dissolved in 1959, and was reconstituted in 1978 by its parent corporation RKO General.

1980s: RKO Pictures Inc.
In 1978, RKO General created a subsidiary, RKO Pictures Inc. Three years later they began to produce a number of feature films and television projects. In collaboration with Universal Studios, RKO put out half a dozen films during the first half of the decade, although none met with much success. from 1985 to 1987 the studio produced several more films on their own, some with more acclaim such as Plenty (1985), Half Moon Street (1986) and Hamburger Hill (1987), but production ended when RKO General underwent a massive reorganization following an attempted hostile takeover, and the production company was eventually sold to Wesray Capital Corporation in late 1987.

1990s–current: RKO Pictures LLC
In 1989, Wesray sold the company to Pavilion Communications, which renamed the entity RKO Pictures LLC. In its latest incarnation, the studio has been involved with several notable films, including Mighty Joe Young (1998), Shade (2003), Are We Done Yet? (2007), A Late Quartet (2012), and Barely Lethal (2015).

Bibliography

References

External links

 Theiapolis
 Turner Classic Movies
 Internet Movie Database

 
RKO
RKO
RKO General
Articles containing video clips